Methylglucoside is a monosaccharide derived from glucose.  It can be prepared in the laboratory by the acid-catalyzed reaction of glucose with methanol.

It is used as a chemical intermediate in the production of a variety of products including emollients, emulsifiers, humectants, moisturizers, thickening agents, plasticizers, surfactants, varnishes, and resins. The formation of methyl glycoside indicates that the structure of glucose is not open chain

References

Glucosides